Exl-Bühne is a theatre group in Austria.

Theatre in Austria